Vasiliy Ivanovich Petrov (– 1 February 2014) was a Russian military official and Marshal of the Soviet Union.

Background
Petrov was born in 1917 in Chernolesskoye, Stavropol Governorate. He completed high school in 1935 and studied for two years at a teacher training institute until 1937.

Petrov joined the Red Army in 1939 and completed the lieutenant's course in 1941.

During World War II, he fought in the defence of Odessa, defence of Sevastopol and the Campaign in the Caucasus. He later took part in the liberation of Ukraine (was part of the USSR) and the invasion of Romania, in addition to the Budapest Offensive in Hungary.

After the war, Petrov completed Military Studies at the Frunze Military Academy in Moscow. He subsequently rose through the Soviet military ranks, being promoted to Colonel in 1952, Major General in 1961, Lieutenant General in 1965, Colonel General in 1970 and General in 1972. In 1983, Petrov was eventually appointed Marshal of the Soviet Union.

In the late 1970s, Petrov served as a military advisor to the Ethiopian Army. He was assigned to assist and rebuild the force during the Ogaden War.

In 1982, Petrov was awarded the Hero of the Soviet Union.

He commanded the Far East Military District in 1972–1976 and served as Commander-in-Chief of Ground Forces in 1980–1985. He then succeeded Sergey Sokolov as First Deputy Minister of Defence until his retirement in 1986 due to ill health.

From 1992, Petrov served as a military advisor to the Ministry of Defence of the Russian Federation. He died in 2014 at the age of 97 and was laid to rest at the Federal Military Memorial Cemetery in Moscow Oblast.

Honours and awards
Soviet Union and Russia
 Hero of the Soviet Union (16 February 1982)
 Order of Alexander Nevskiy (3 May 2012)
 Four Orders of Lenin (December 1967,  February 1978, 16 February 1982, January 1987)
 Order of the October Revolution (February 1974)
 Order of the Red Banner (October 1944)
 Order of the Patriotic War, 1st class, twice (July 1944, April 1985), 2nd class (October 1943)
 Order of the Red Star, twice (November 1942, October 1955)
 Order for Service to the Homeland in the Armed Forces of the USSR, 3rd class (February 1976)
 Medal for Combat Service
 Medal "For Distinction in Guarding the State Border of the USSR"
 Medal "For the Defence of the Caucasus"
 Medal "For the Defence of Odessa"
 Medal "For the Defence of Sevastopol"
 Medal "For Strengthening Military Cooperation"
 Medal "For the Victory over Germany in the Great Patriotic War 1941–1945"
 Jubilee Medal "Twenty Years of Victory in the Great Patriotic War 1941–1945"
 Jubilee Medal "Thirty Years of Victory in the Great Patriotic War 1941–1945"
 Jubilee Medal "Forty Years of Victory in the Great Patriotic War 1941–1945"
 Medal "For the Capture of Budapest"
 Jubilee Medal "50 Years of Victory in the Great Patriotic War 1941–1945"
 Jubilee Medal "60 Years of Victory in the Great Patriotic War 1941–1945"
 Jubilee Medal "65 Years of Victory in the Great Patriotic War 1941–1945"

Foreign awards
 Order "Ernesto Che Guevara", 1st class (Cuba, 1985)
 Order of the Red Banner (Czechoslovakia) (1982)
 Order of Victorious February (Czechoslovakia) (1985)
 Order of Sukhbaatar (Mongolia, 1981)
 Order of the Red Banner (Mongolia, 1982)
 Order "For Military Merit" (Mongolia, 1971)
 Scharnhorst Order (East Germany, 1983)
 Order of the Flag of the Hungarian People's Republic with diamonds (Hungary, 1985)
 Order of Tudor Vladimirescu, 1st class (Romania, 1974)
 Order "For Military Merit", 1st class (Romania, 1985)
 Order of the National Flag (Ethiopia, 1982)
 Order of National Flag of Korea (North Korea, 1985)
 Order "The People's Republic of Bulgaria", 1st class (1985)
 Order "For military Valour", 1st class (1983)

Faith-based
 Order of St. Grand Prince Dmitriy Donskoy, 2nd class

Notes

References

1917 births
2014 deaths
People from Novoselitsky District
People from Stavropol Governorate
Marshals of the Soviet Union
Soviet military personnel of World War II
Frunze Military Academy alumni
Heroes of the Soviet Union
Recipients of the Medal "For Distinction in Guarding the State Border of the USSR"
Recipients of the Order of Lenin
Recipients of the Order of the Red Banner
Burials at the Federal Military Memorial Cemetery
Military Academy of the General Staff of the Armed Forces of the Soviet Union alumni